The List of number-one albums of 2002 in Spain is derived from the Top 100 España record chart published weekly by PROMUSICAE (Productores de Música de España), a non-profit organization composed by Spain and multinational record companies. This association tracks record sales (physical and digital) in Spain.

Albums

See also
List of number-one singles of 2002 (Spain)

References

Number-one albums
Spain
Spanish record charts